The Persimmon Mound is a historic site near Rockledge, Florida, located approximately 10 miles southwest of Rockledge on the east bank of a former channel of the St. Johns River.  On 14 April 1994 it was added to the U.S. National Register of Historic Places.  It is located in the Seminole Ranch Conservation Area/Seminole Ranch Wildlife Management Area.

References

External links
 Brevard County listings at National Register of Historic Places.
 Brevard County listings at Florida's Office of Cultural and Historical Programs.

See also
 List of burial mounds in the United States

Woodland period
Archaeological sites in Florida
National Register of Historic Places in Brevard County, Florida
Mounds in Florida